Fernand Charpin (30 May 1887 – 6 November 1944) was a French actor. He is known for his role as Honoré Panisse in Marcel Pagnol's Marseille trilogy, beginning with Marius in 1931.

Selected filmography
 Marius (1931)
 Fanny (1932)
 Court Waltzes (1933)
 Chotard and Company (1933)
 The Barber of Seville (1933)
 Paprika (1933)
 Sapho (1934)
 Three Sailors (1934)
 César (1936)
 Michel Strogoff (1936)
 Pépé le Moko (1937)
 The Club of Aristocrats (1937)
 The Baker's Wife (1938)
 The Little Thing (1938)
 In the Sun of Marseille (1938)
 Whirlwind of Paris (1939)
 Berlingot and Company (1939) 
 The Marvelous Night (1940)
 Strange Suzy (1941)
 The Blue Veil (1942)
 The Secret of Madame Clapain (1943)
 The White Truck (1943)
 The Island of Love (1944)
 La Fiancée des ténèbres (1945)
 Majestic Hotel Cellars (1945)
 The Last Penny (1946)

External links

1887 births
1944 deaths
French male film actors
French male stage actors
Male actors from Marseille
20th-century French male actors
Burials at Batignolles Cemetery